Events from the year 1955 in North Korea.

Incumbents
Premier: Kim Il-sung 
Supreme Leader: Kim Il-sung

Events
 28 December: Kim Il-sung delivers his "Juche Speech", On Eliminating Dogmatism and Formalism and Establishing Juche in Ideological Work.

Establishments

 Foundation of  Ice Hockey Association of North Korea.

See also

Years in Japan
Years in South Korea

References

 
North Korea
1950s in North Korea
Years of the 20th century in North Korea
North Korea